Coatdyke railway station is situated on Quarry Street/Riddell Street in the Cliftonville area of Coatbridge and  east of Glasgow Queen Street. It is the closest railway station to Coatbridge College and Monklands Hospital.

History 

The station was opened as part of the Bathgate and Coatbridge Railway on 1 February 1871.
The station now has no structures other than simple shelters. The ticket hall that was built when the Airdrie-Helensburgh line was electrified in 1960 was demolished in the early 1990s. Similar structures, built in the same style, still survive at Easterhouse and Airdrie stations.

Services 
Monday to Saturday daytimes:

Half-hourly service towards Edinburgh Waverley
Half-hourly service towards Airdrie 
Half-hourly service towards Balloch via Glasgow Queen Street Low Level
Half-hourly service towards Helensburgh Central via Glasgow Queen Street Low Level (as of 2019 this service does not always call at Shettleston, Cartyne and Easterhouse. Passengers for these stations use the half-hourly service towards Balloch instead.)

Evening services are as follows: 
Half-hourly service towards Airdrie 
Half-hourly service towards Balloch via Glasgow Queen Street Low Level

Sunday services are as follows: 
Half-hourly service towards Edinburgh Waverley 
Half-hourly service towards Helensburgh Central

Facilities
There is a small car park in the street outside the station. This station is unstaffed.

References

Notes

Sources 
 
 
 RAILSCOT on Bathgate and Coatbridge Railway

Railway stations in North Lanarkshire
Former North British Railway stations
Railway stations in Great Britain opened in 1871
Railway stations served by ScotRail
Coatbridge
Airdrie, North Lanarkshire